The 1973–74 Connecticut Huskies men's basketball team represented the University of Connecticut in the 1973–74 collegiate men's basketball season. The Huskies completed the season with a 19–8 overall record. The Huskies were members of the Yankee Conference, where they ended the season with a 9–3 record. They made it to the quarterfinals in the 1974 National Invitation Tournament. The Huskies played their home games at Hugh S. Greer Field House in Storrs, Connecticut, and were led by fifth-year head coach Dee Rowe.

Schedule 

|-
!colspan=12 style=""| Regular Season

|-
!colspan=12 style=""| NIT

Schedule Source:

References 

UConn Huskies men's basketball seasons
Connecticut
Connecticut
1973 in sports in Connecticut
1974 in sports in Connecticut